Saeid Mollaei was born on January 5, 1992, in Tehran to ethnic Azerbaijani parents originally from Khoy. In 2001, at the age of 10, he entered the Persian Gulf Judo School by Dr. Mehrdad Hassanzadeh, a judo instructor. Iranian authorities ordered Mollaei to intentionally lose in the semi-final at the Tokyo 2019 World Championships, so as to avoid a potential match in the finals against Israeli 2019 world champion Sagi Muki. In August 2019, he moved to Europe with a two-year visa from Germany, saying he was afraid to return to Iran after exposing and criticizing its pressure on him to deliberately lose in the World Championships. In December 2019, he became a citizen of Mongolia. He dedicated his 2020 Olympic medal to Mongolia and Mongol People  and to Israel. From May 2022 on, Mollaei represents Azerbaijan.

Judo career
He won bronze medals at the 2015 and 2016 Asian Championships, and a silver medal at the 2017 edition.  He was a bronze medalist at the Budapest 2017 World Championships, and a 2018 Baku World Championships gold medalist.

He competed at the 2016 Summer Olympics in the 81 kg event, and was eliminated in the first bout by Khasan Khalmurzaev.

Iranian authorities, the Iranian Sports Minister and the presidents of the Iran Judo Federation and the Iran Olympic Committee, ordered Mollaei to intentionally lose in the semi-final at the Tokyo 2019 World Championships, so as to avoid a potential match in the finals against Israeli 2019 world champion Sagi Muki.

In reaction, saying he was afraid to return to Iran after exposing and criticizing its pressure on him to deliberately lose in the World Championships to avoid a potential bout against Muki, in August 2019 he moved to Europe with a two-year visa from Germany.

Iran's actions led the International Judo Federation (IJF) to indefinitely ban Iran from competition. The IJF disciplinary commission examining the case found that Iran's actions "constitute a serious breach and gross violation of the Statutes of the IJF, its legitimate interests, its principles and objectives." The ban will last until "the Iran Judo Federation give strong guarantees and prove that they will respect the IJF Statutes and accept that their athletes fight against Israeli athletes."

On 1 November 2019 Germany agreed to grant Mollaei asylum. That month, he competed as part of the IJF refugee team at the Osaka Grand Slam. Muki congratulated Mollaei on Instagram for returning to judo and participating in Osaka in his first competition since the World Championships in Tokyo, and Mollaei, in turn, thanked Muki for his support and wrote: "Good luck to you all the time, my best friend."  Mollaei also posted a photo of them standing together, and wrote: "This is true friendship and a win for sports and judo over politics."

On 16 November 2019, he  received the Crans Montana Forum gold medal from Ambassador Jean-Paul Carteron for the difficult decision he took in Japan. The mission of the Crans Montana Forum is "Towards a more Humane World". In accepting the award, Mollaei said: "We must try to make a better world. A peaceful world, more equal, more friendly, and more fair."

On 1 December 2019, Mongolian President Khaltmaagiin Battulga (himself the chairman of Mongolian Judo Federation) offered him citizenship, which he accepted.

Mollaei arrived in Israel in February 2021 to compete at the Tel Aviv Grand Prix. He represented Mongolia at Grand Slam Hungary 2020 and won bronze medal in –81 kg category.

Mollaei trained in Israel with the Israeli national judo team in the months prior to the 2020 Summer Olympics. He went on to win the silver medal in the men's –81 kg event.

See also
Boycotts of Israel in sports
List of Iranian defectors

References

External links

 
 
 
 
 

1992 births
Living people
Iranian male judoka
Mongolian male judoka
Olympic judoka of Iran
Judoka at the 2016 Summer Olympics
Judoka at the 2014 Asian Games
Judoka at the 2018 Asian Games
Asian Games silver medalists for Iran
Asian Games medalists in judo
Medalists at the 2018 Asian Games
Sportspeople from Tehran
Mongolian sportsmen
World judo champions
Defecting sportspeople of the Islamic Republic of Iran
Iranian refugees
Naturalised citizens of Mongolia
Judoka at the 2020 Summer Olympics
Olympic judoka of Mongolia
Olympic medalists in judo
Olympic silver medalists for Mongolia
Medalists at the 2020 Summer Olympics
Islamic Solidarity Games competitors for Iran